Schalk Hugo (born 17 August 1994) is an South African rugby union player.
His usual position is as a Fly-Half and he currently plays for Calvisano in Top12.

From 2015 to 2018 he played with Leopards in Currie Cup.

References

External links
It's Rugby England Profile
Eurosport Profile
All Rugby Profile
Ultimate Rugby Profile

1995 births
Living people
South African rugby union players
Rugby union fly-halves
Leopards (rugby union) players